BLISS is a system programming language developed at Carnegie Mellon University (CMU) by W. A. Wulf, D. B. Russell, and A. N. Habermann around 1970. It was perhaps the best known system language until C debuted a few years later. Since then, C became popular and common, and BLISS faded into obscurity. When C was in its infancy, a few projects within Bell Labs debated the merits of BLISS vs. C.

BLISS is a typeless block-structured programming language based on expressions rather than statements, and includes constructs for exception handling, coroutines, and macros. It does not include a goto statement.

The name is variously said to be short for Basic Language for Implementation of System Software or System Software Implementation Language, Backwards. It was sometimes called "Bill's Language for Implementing System Software", after Bill Wulf.

The original Carnegie Mellon compiler was notable for its extensive use of optimizations, and formed the basis of the classic book The Design of an Optimizing Compiler.

Digital Equipment Corporation (DEC) developed and maintained BLISS compilers for the PDP-10, PDP-11, VAX, DEC PRISM, MIPS, DEC Alpha, and Intel IA-32, The language did not become popular among customers and few had the compiler, but DEC used it heavily in-house into the 1980s; most of the utility programs for the OpenVMS operating system were written in BLISS-32. The DEC BLISS compiler has been ported to the IA-64 and x86-64 architectures as part of the ports of OpenVMS to these platforms. The x86-64 BLISS compiler uses LLVM as its backend code generator, replacing the proprietary GEM backend used for Alpha and IA-64.

Language description 

The BLISS language has the following characteristics:

 All constants are full word for the machine being used, e.g. on a 16-bit machine such as the PDP-11, a constant is 16 bits; on a VAX computer, constants are 32 bits, and on a PDP-10, a constant is 36 bits.
 A reference to a variable is always to the address of that variable. For example, the instruction Z+8 refers to adding 8 to the address of Z, not to its value. If one needs to add 8 to the value of Z, one must prefix the variable with a period; so one would type .Z+8 to perform this function, which adds 8 to the contents of Z.
 Assignment is done with the standard = symbol, e.g. Z=8 – which says to create a full-word constant containing 8, and store it in the location whose address corresponds to that of Z. So Z+12=14 (or, alternatively 12+Z=14) places the constant 14 into the location which is 12 words after the address of Z. (This is considered bad practice.)
 Block statements are similar to those of ALGOL: a block is started with a BEGIN statement and terminated with END. As with ALGOL, statements are terminated with the semicolon (";"). When a value is computed, it is saved until the next statement terminator – which means that a value can be computed, assigned to a variable, and carried forward to the next statement, if desired. Alternatively, an open parenthesis may be used to begin a block, with the close parenthesis used to close the block. When parentheses are included in an expression, the standard precedence rules are used, in which parenthesized expressions are computed first,
 Conditional execution uses the IF expression, which tests a true-false condition, performs alternative actions, and returns a result.
 Comparison uses keywords such as EQL for equality (as opposed to overloading the = symbol for the same purpose), GTR for Greater Than, and NEQ for not equal. For example, the following code will assign the absolute value of Z to the address indicated by Q:

Q = (IF .Z GTR 0 THEN .Z ELSE -.Z);

 Identifiers (variables and constants) must be declared before use, typically using the OWN keyword. Declaring a variable normally causes the compiler to allocate space for it; when necessary, a variable may be assigned a fixed machine address via the BIND declaration. This feature is primarily used for accessing either machine registers or certain special addresses.
 Subroutines in the language are called routines, and are declared with the keyword ROUTINE.
 Macros, which allow for text substitution, are declared with the keyword MACRO.
 The language supports arrays, which are referred to as structures, and declared with the keyword VECTOR.
 The language supports some high-level programming language constructs such as:
Alternative execution paths via the CASE expression
Looping through use of the INCR expression, which is similar to ALGOL's FOR statement
Built-in string functions
Certain automatic data conversions (number to string, etc.)

Source example
The following example is taken verbatim from the Bliss Language Manual:

MODULE E1 (MAIN = CTRL) =
BEGIN
FORWARD ROUTINE
    CTRL,
    STEP;
ROUTINE CTRL =
!+
! This routine inputs a value, operates on it, and
! then outputs the result.
!-
    BEGIN
    EXTERNAL ROUTINE
        GETNUM,     ! Input a number from terminal
        PUTNUM;     ! Output a number to terminal
    LOCAL
        X,          ! Storage for input value
        Y;          ! Storage for output value
    GETNUM(X);
    Y = STEP(.X);
    PUTNUM(.Y)
    END;
ROUTINE STEP(A) =
!+
! This routine adds 1 to the given value.
!-
    (.A+1);
END
ELUDOM

Versions 

 BLISS-10
 BLISS-11 - a cross compiler for the PDP-11
 BLISS-16
 BLISS-16C - DEC version of BLISS-11
 BLISS-32
 BLISS-36
 BLISS-64 
 Common BLISS - portable subset

Notes

References 
 Also: "BLISS: A Language for Systems Programming". (PostScript)
 Wulf, W. A.; Johnson, R. K.; Weinstock, C. B.; Hobbs, S. O.; Geschke, C. M. (1975). The Design of an Optimizing Compiler. New York: Elsevier, .

External links 
 BLISS Manual at DECUS

 Lehotsky, Alan; a post about BLISS at DEC

 Madison, Matthew D.; Session notes for "Introduction to BLISS" (PostScript)

Downloads 
 BLISS-10
 BLISS-11
 BLISS-36
 BLISS-11, BLISS-32 and BLISS-64
 FreeVMS Portable BLISS for GCC

Systems programming languages
OpenVMS software
Carnegie Mellon University software
Programming languages
Programming languages created in 1970